Gilmer County is a county in the U.S. state of West Virginia. As of the 2020 census, the population was 7,408, making it West Virginia's fifth-least populous county. Its county seat is Glenville. The county was formed in 1845 from parts of Lewis and Kanawha Counties, and named for Thomas Walker Gilmer, Governor of Virginia from 1840 to 1841. Gilmer was later a representative in the United States Congress and Secretary of the Navy in President John Tyler's cabinet.

Cedar Creek State Park offers camping, fishing, swimming, and hiking. The West Virginia State Folk Festival is held each June. Glenville State College has a community activity center, a state-of-the-art library, and a complete collection of hand-carved, West Virginia–native birds on public display. The Gilmer County Recreation Center Complex includes a small golf course, a convention / reunion hall, and bunk houses. Gilmer County is home to ten nationally registered historic landmarks, the Cedar Creek Backway, and the annual West Virginia Folk Festival. Media outlets for the community include The Glenville Democrat and The Glenville Pathfinder, the county's two newspapers.

Gilmer County is also the site of Federal Correctional Institution, Gilmer, a federal medium security prison for men and the county's largest employer.

As of 2022, Gilmer County has one permanent traffic light. It is located in the town of Glenville.

Geography

In 1863, West Virginia's counties were divided into civil townships, with the intention of encouraging local government.  This proved impractical in the heavily rural state, and in 1872 the townships were converted into magisterial districts.  Gilmer County was divided into four districts: Centre, De Kalb, Glenville, and Troy.  In the 1980s, De Kalb and Troy Districts were combined to form De Kalb-Troy District, and a new district, City, was established.

Major highways
 U.S. Highway 33
 U.S. Highway 119
 West Virginia Route 5
 West Virginia Route 18
 West Virginia Route 47
 West Virginia Route 74
 Interstate 79 (No exits within county)

Adjacent counties
Doddridge County (north)
Lewis County (east)
Braxton County (south)
Calhoun County (west)
Ritchie County (northwest)

Demographics

2000 census
As of the census of 2000, there were 7,160 people, 2,768 households, and 1,862 families living in the county.  The population density was 21 people per square mile (8/km2).  There were 3,621 housing units at an average density of 11 per square mile (4/km2).  The racial makeup of the county was 97.33% White, 0.91% Black or African American, 0.20% Native American, 0.57% Asian, 0.01% Pacific Islander, 0.10% from other races, and 0.88% from two or more races.  0.70% of the population were Hispanic or Latino of any race.

There were 2,768 households, out of which 28.20% had children under the age of 18 living with them, 54.40% were married couples living together, 8.60% had a female householder with no husband present, and 32.70% were non-families. 25.50% of all households were made up of individuals, and 12.30% had someone living alone who was 65 years of age or older.  The average household size was 2.43 and the average family size was 2.92.

In the county, the population was spread out, with 20.30% under the age of 18, 16.40% from 18 to 24, 24.50% from 25 to 44, 23.50% from 45 to 64, and 15.30% who were 65 years of age or older.  The median age was 37 years. For every 100 females there were 101.10 males.  For every 100 females age 18 and over, there were 101.40 males.

The median income for a household in the county was $22,857, and the median income for a family was $28,685. Males had a median income of $25,497 versus $15,353 for females. The per capita income for the county was $12,498.  About 20.20% of families and 25.90% of the population were below the poverty line, including 27.70% of those under age 18 and 8.90% of those age 65 or over.

2010 census
As of the 2010 United States census, there were 8,693 people, 2,753 households, and 1,806 families living in the county. The racial makeup of the county was 82.5% white, 12.3% black or African American, 0.5% American Indian, 0.4% Asian, 0.1% Pacific islander, 2.4% from other races, and 1.7% from two or more races. Those of Hispanic or Latino origin made up 5.7% of the population. In terms of ancestry, 23.1% were German, 14.9% were Irish, 9.6% were American, and 6.1% were English.

Of the 2,753 households, 25.9% had children under the age of 18 living with them, 49.8% were married couples living together, 10.1% had a female householder with no husband present, 34.4% were non-families, and 27.6% of all households were made up of individuals. The average household size was 2.34 and the average family size was 2.83. The median age was 38.0 years.

The median income for a household in the county was $29,706 and the median income for a family was $38,044. Males had a median income of $30,654 versus $16,834 for females. The per capita income for the county was $13,899. About 25.1% of families and 30.3% of the population were below the poverty line, including 39.4% of those under age 18 and 13.1% of those age 65 or over.

Politics
Historically, Gilmer County was the northwesternmost of the fiercely Democratic, secessionist counties of West Virginia. It voted Democratic in every election from 1872 to 1968 – in 1928 when there was large-scale anti-Catholic voting throughout Appalachian West Virginia it was Al Smith’s strongest county in the state. In 1972, against the strongly left-wing George McGovern, Richard Nixon became the first Republican to carry the county in 104 years, and in a similar landslide Ronald Reagan repeated this in 1984. Like all of West Virginia, since 2000 Gilmer County has seen a powerful swing towards the Republican Party due to declining unionization and differences with the Democratic Party’s liberal views.

Communities

Towns
Glenville (county seat)
Sand Fork

Magisterial districts
Center
City
De Kalb-Troy
Glenville

Unincorporated communities

Baldwin
Cedarville
Coxs Mills
Dusk
Gilmer
Letter Gap
Linn
Normantown
Rosedale
Sand Fork
Shock
Stouts Mills
Stumptown
Tanner
Troy

See also
 Cedar Creek State Park
National Register of Historic Places listings in Gilmer County, West Virginia
 Stumptown Wildlife Management Area

Footnotes

References

External links
Gilmer County official Site
Virtual Visit to Gilmer County
WVGenWeb Gilmer County
The November 2003 Flood 
Two-Lane Livin' Magazine
West Virginia State Folk Festival

 
1845 establishments in Virginia
Populated places established in 1845
Counties of Appalachia